Benzotriyne or cyclo[6]carbon is a hypothetical compound, an allotrope of carbon with molecular formula .  The molecule is a ring of six carbon atoms, connected  by alternating triple and single bonds.  It is, therefore, a potential member of the cyclo[n]carbon family.

There have been a few attempts to synthesize benzotriyne, e.g. by pyrolysis of mellitic anhydride, but without success .

Recent investigations have concluded that benzotriyne is unlikely to exist due to the large angle strain. A likely alternative isomer would be a cyclic cumulene called cyclohexahexaene, which should itself be a metastable species.

The name cracatene was suggested for this compound (after Karel Čapek's Krakatit, a hypothetical explosive).

References 

Cyclocarbons
Hypothetical chemical compounds
Polyynes
Six-membered rings